Dazhu Bridge, formerly known as "Zhu Bridge", "Shangzhu Bridge"or "Wannian Bridge", is a historic stone arch bridge in Zhuantang Subdistrict, Xihu District, Hangzhou, Zhejiang province.

History
The bridge was originally built in the Song dynasty (907–1279). It was rebuilt in 1588, during the reign of Wanli Emperor in the Ming dynasty. On July 9, 2000, it was designated as a municipal cultural unit by the local government.

References

Bridges in Zhejiang
Arch bridges in China
Ming dynasty architecture
Bridges completed in 1588
Buildings and structures completed in 1588